Bolshoye Selo is a rural locality (a selo) and the administrative center of Bolsheselsky District of Yaroslavl Oblast, Russia. Population:

History
Bolshoye Selo was first mentioned in 1567 as belonging to the princely House of Mstislavl. In 1706, Peter the Great gave the property  to Count Boris Sheremetev. The Shheremetev family owned the Yukhot volost until 1917. The church of St. Paraskevi was built in 1747 on the Yuhkot River.

References

Rural localities in Yaroslavl Oblast
Bolsheselsky District
Uglichsky Uyezd